Liucun is a town in Xushui District, Baoding, Hebei province, China. , it has 18 villages under its administration: 
Liucun Village
Nangaoqiao Village
Changle Village
Shizhuang Village
Beichangpu Village
Liudongying Village
Dongzhuang Village
Nanzhuang Village
Tianzhuang Village
Hujiaying Village
Yi Village
Shandongying Village
Liuxiangdian Village
Banbidian Village
Jingtangpu Village
Daying Village
Nanting Village
Beigaoqiao Village

See also 
 List of township-level divisions of Hebei

References 

Township-level divisions of Hebei
Geography of Baoding